A Life in the Balance is a 1955 American-Mexican thriller film directed by Harry Horner and Rafael Portillo and starring Ricardo Montalban, Anne Bancroft and Lee Marvin. It was shot in Mexico, and distributed in the United States by Twentieth Century Fox.

The film's sets were designed by the art director Gunther Gerszo.

Plot

Antonio Gomez (Ricardo Montalban) is a nearly down-and-out musician and widower with an eleven year old  boy, Paco (José Pérez) in Mexico City. 
Trying to support his boy in the face of unemployment and neighbors who want custody of his son, Gomez argues with an ex-girlfriend (Eva Calvo) over money she owes him. After he leaves, the girlfriend is murdered by the religious-fanatic serial killer terrorizing the city (Lee Marvin), who stabs his young female victims and leaves them with their arms folded. 
When neighbors report the argument Gomez had with the murdered girl, the police presume they are finally on the trail of the serial killer, and Gomez is their target. 
Gomez goes out to a pawnshop to buy his son a long-dreamed-of guitar and there meets a young woman  (Anne Bancroft)  with whom he goes looking for his son. 
What Gomez does not realize is that a police dragnet is closing in on him and that his boy Paco actually witnessed this most recent murder and has been trailing the killer.
It's not long, though, before the killer has spotted the boy and kidnaps him. The boy is forced to accompany the killer over the course of a night while the killer is asking God who he should kill next while Paco watches and looks for a way to escape. 
Hauled in by the police, Antonio and Maria learn what has happened to Paco, and with the help of the police, attempt to locate him and his kidnapper before the psychopath notches up another knife murder.

Cast
 Ricardo Montalban as Antonio Gómez  
 Anne Bancroft as María Ibinia  
 Lee Marvin as The Killer  
 José Pérez as Paco Gómez  
 Rodolfo Acosta as Lt. Fernando  
 Carlos Múzquiz as Capt. Saldana  
 Jorge Treviño as Sergeant 
 José Torvay as Andrés Martínez  
 Eva Calvo as Carla Arlota 
 Fanny Schiller as Carmen Martínez  
 Tamara Garina as Doña Lucrecia  
 Pascual García Peña as Porter  
 Tony Carbajal as Pedro

See also
List of American films of 1955

References

Bibliography
 Cox, James H. Muting White Noise: Native American and European American Novel Traditions. University of Oklahoma Press, 2012.

External links
 

1955 films
1950s serial killer films
1950s thriller films
Mexican thriller films
American thriller films
Films based on short fiction
Films based on works by Georges Simenon
Films directed by Harry Horner
Films directed by Rafael Portillo
Films shot in Mexico
20th Century Fox films
1950s English-language films
1950s American films
American black-and-white films
Mexican black-and-white films
1950s Mexican films